is a Japanese football manager, currently the Assistant Coach at Singapore Premier League side Albirex Niigata Singapore.

Career
Shigetomi was appointed manager of Albirex Niigata Singapore for the 2019 season, following spells as a coach with Oshu Soccer Club and the Sanfrecce Hiroshima Soccer School. He was also head coach at Hijiyama University between 2005 and 2006, and spent the 2018 season as academy director at Albirex Niigata Singapore, after three seasons as manager of the club's youth sector.

Managerial statistics

References

1979 births
Living people
Japanese expatriate sportspeople in Singapore
Expatriate football managers in Singapore
Japanese football managers